Jean-Pierre Leburton (Liège, Belgium-) is the Gregory E. Stillman Professor of Electrical and Computer Engineering and professor of Physics at the University of Illinois at Urbana–Champaign.
He is also a full-time faculty member in the Nanoelectronics and Nanomaterials group of the Beckman Institute for Advanced Science and Technology.  
He is known for his work on semiconductor theory and simulation, and on nanoscale quantum devices including quantum wires, quantum dots, and quantum wells. He studies and develops nanoscale materials with potential electronic and biological applications.

Early life and education
His father, at one time Prime Minister of Belgium, sparked Jean-Pierre Leburton's interest in physics.

Jean-Pierre Leburton received his Licence (B.Sc.) in Physics in 1971 and his Doctorat (Ph.D.) in 1978 from the University of Liège, Belgium.

Career
Leburton worked as a research scientist at the Siemens AG research laboratory in Munich, Germany from 1979 to 1981.

From 1981-1983, Leburton worked at the University of Illinois at Urbana–Champaign (UIUC) as a visiting assistant professor. In 1983 he joined the faculty as an assistant professor. He became an associate Professor in 1987 and a full professor in 1991.  He worked with Karl Hess, co-director of the Beckman Institute for Advanced Science and Technology, and became one of the original faculty members at the Beckman Institute in 1989.

He held the Hitachi LTD Chair on Quantum Materials as a visiting professor at the University of Tokyo, Japan in 1992. He was also a visiting professor at the Swiss Federal Institute of Technology in  Lausanne, Switzerland in 2000.

In 2003, he was named the Gregory E. Stillman Professor of Electrical and Computer Engineering at the University of Illinois.  
He has been the head of the Computational Electronics group at the Beckman Institute, and is currently a full-time faculty member in the Nanoelectronics and Nanomaterials group at the Beckman Institute.  
In 2008 he also became a professor of physics at UIUC.

He has published more than 300 papers in technical journals and books. 
He is first editor of Phonons in semiconductor nanostructures (1993) and co-editor of Contemporary Topics in Semiconductor Spintronics (2017), among others.

Research
Leburton has consistently been a pioneer, whose investigations of ideas begin at the farthest edges of what is possible.  In addition to his own research team and other researchers at the University of Illinois, he collaborates with researchers at other institutions.  His work has impact in a wide variety of areas, from computer design to medical diagnosis.

In the 1980s and 1990s, Leburton began to study quantum wires. He developed simulation tools to study quantum confinement using a combination of solid-state physics principles and device simulation. 
He was the first to develop a technique for Monte Carlo simulation of non-linear transport in quantum wires.

His simulation tools and physical models help to describe behavior of quantum wires, quantum dots, and quantum wells. 
He has studied the optical properties of superlattices and established the index of refraction in superlattices both experimentally and theoretically.

Techniques for effective and inexpensive DNA sensing and sequencing are important to understanding disease mechanisms, identifying genetically-based conditions, and developing methods for personalized diagnosis and treatment. In 2004, the National Institutes of Health (NIH) defined a set of goals for DNA sensing and sequencing. Leburton participated with Greg Timp and others  in the NIH's Revolutionary Genome Sequencing Technologies program, popularly known as the "$1000 genome" project.
Their goal was to develop a synthetic nanopore for the sequencing of DNA. Leburton developed a novel approach, applying techniques from semiconductor technology to artificial nanopores.
By 2006, they were able to create multilayer artificial membranes, using semiconductor materials, and to manipulate their ion flow.
Nanopore sequencing has been classed as a third-generation sequencing technique, and considered one of the most promising approaches to meeting the NIH's "gold standard".

Leburton, Klaus Schulten and others studied the structure and behavior of graphene nanoribbons, developing and testing models for hybrid solid-liquid systems. A two-dimensional material consisting of a single atomic layer of material, graphene has particularly interesting electronic properties.  By manipulating graphene's electrical properties, researchers detected DNA molecules passing through a nanopore in a graphene layer embedded in a solid-state membrane. The electrical sensitivity of the graphene membrane varied depending on its geometry. Researchers could detect both rotational and positional conformation of the DNA strand.

Leburton and his colleagues have since developed methods for detecting DNA methylation using nanopore sensors. This approach has important applications for the early detection of cancer.

Leburton has been involved in ongoing study of spintronics in semiconductor nanostructures, including the movement of electrons through carbon nanotubes and the application of physics to all-carbon, cascaded spintronic circuit design.  
In a high electric field graphene may behave like a transistor. Leburton and others are studying graphene's behavior in such conditions, examining the possibility of developing biomolecules with nanoelectronic properties.

Awards
 2017, Lifetime membership in the Institute of Electrical and Electronics Engineers (IEEE)
 2011, Associate of the Royal Academy of Belgium
 2008, Fellow of the Institute of Physics, London
 2004, Quantum Devices Award, International Symposium on Compound Semiconductors
 2004, Gold Medal for Scientific Achievement, 75th Anniversary of the Alumnus Association of the University of Liège, Belgium
 2003, named Gregory E. Stillman Professor of Electrical and Computer Engineering at the University of Illinois
 2005, Fellow of the Electrochemical Society
 2001, Fellow of the Optical Society of America (OSA) 
 2001, Fellow of the American Association for the Advancement of Science (AAAS)
 1999, Fellow of the American Physical Society (APS)
 1996, Fellow, Institute of Electrical and Electronics Engineers (IEEE)
 1993, Chevalier Dans L'Ordre des Palmes Académiques, national order of France

References 

1949 births
Living people
American physicists
University of Illinois faculty
Fellows of the American Association for the Advancement of Science
Fellows of the American Physical Society